William Berger Lynch (born January 10, 1943) is a former Adjutant General of Pennsylvania for the Pennsylvania Department of Military and Veterans Affairs.

References

1943 births
Living people
State cabinet secretaries of Pennsylvania